Valchan Peak is the sharp rocky peak in Ellsworth Mountains, Antarctica rising to 2750 m on the side ridge that trends 15 km from Mount Bentley on the main crest of north-central Sentinel Range west-northwest to Mount Hubley.

The peak is named after the Bulgarian rebel leader Valchan Voyvoda (Valchan Pandurski, 1775–1863).

Location
US mapping in 1961 and 1988.

Maps
 Antarctic Digital Database (ADD). Scale 1:250000 topographic map of Antarctica. Scientific Committee on Antarctic Research (SCAR). Since 1993, regularly updated.

Notes

References
 Valchan Peak. SCAR Composite Gazetteer of Antarctica.
 Bulgarian Antarctic Gazetteer. Antarctic Place-names Commission. (details in Bulgarian, basic data in English)

External links
 Valchan Peak. Copernix satellite image

Ellsworth Mountains
Bulgaria and the Antarctic
Mountains of Ellsworth Land